Érase una vez (stylized onscreen Érase una vez, lo que no te contaron del cuento), is a Mexican crime drama streaming television series produced by Andrés Tovar, Gonzalo Cilley, Pedro Ybarra, Araceli Sánchez Mariscal and Marcela Ibarra for Blim. Based on the classic stories, the series shows the current situation in Mexico. The first season was released on 2 October 2017.

Cast 
 Enrique Rocha as Narrator
 Pablo Lyle as Esteban (episode, "Blanca Nieves")
 Renata Notni as Blanca Valle (episode, "Blanca Nieves")
 Anna Ciocchetti as Lucía Cardeña (episode, "Blanca Nieves")
 Luis Arrieta as Mateo Toledo (episode, "Los tres cochinitos")
 Andrés Palacios as Vidal (episode, "Caperucita Roja")
 Alejandro Belmonte as Galindo (episode, "Ricitos de oro")
 Alicia Jaziz as Pilar (episode, "Caperucita Roja")
 Evangelina Elizondo as Ágata (episode, "La bella y la bestia")
 Fabiola Guajardo as Diana (episode, "El príncipe y el mendigo")
 Sergio Lozano as Carlos / Eduardo (episode, "El príncipe y el mendigo")
 Osvaldo de León as Daniel Torres (episode, "El gato con botas")
 Isela Vega as Águeda (episode, "Hansel y Gretel")
 Ana Layevska as Cinthia (episode, "Patito feo")
 Valentina Acosta as Noemí (episode, "La bella y la bestia")
 Carlos Ferro as Marco Thierón (episode, "La bella y la bestia")
 Moisés Arizmendi as Ricardo Toledo (episode, "La bella y la bestia")
 Eduardo Victoria as Sergio Montiel (episode, "El príncipe y el mendigo")

Production 
The series is adapted to the police genre, but from a dark and sophisticated point of view. The first season consists of 12 episodes, each with a beginning of plot and closing. In the first season they tell classic stories such as Little Red Riding Hood, Snow White, The Boy Who Cried Wolf, The Prince and the Pauper, Puss in Boots, Goldilocks and the Three Bears, Beauty and the Beast, The Three Little Pigs, Sleeping Beauty, Pinocchio, and Hansel & Gretel each of these stories will be adapted to the present.

Episodes 
The season consists of a total of 12 episodes.

Ratings 
 
}}

Awards and nominations

References

External links 
 

2010s Mexican television series
Mexican drama television series
Blim TV original programming
2017 Mexican television series debuts
Televisa original programming
Canal 5 (Mexico) original programming
2017 Mexican television series endings